Craig Potter (born 19 January 1966) is a former Australian rules footballer who played with Sydney and Brisbane Bears in the Victorian/Australian Football League (VFL/AFL).

Queenslander Craig Potter was a strong performer for his state in the Teal Cup and played originally for Western Districts. Recruited by Sydney, he made his VFL debut at the age of just 18 but struggled with injuries. He played three games in 1984 but none in 1985 and 1986. The most games he put together was 14 in 1988 and in 1991 he was traded back home to Brisbane, in a deal which helped bring Warwick Capper back to Sydney.

Potter, a utility, spent just two seasons at Brisbane and finished his career in the SANFL with Central District. He won their 'Best and Fairest' award in 1993.

References

External links
 
 

1966 births
Living people
Sydney Swans players
Brisbane Bears players
Central District Football Club players
Western Magpies Australian Football Club players
Australian rules footballers from Queensland
New South Wales Australian rules football State of Origin players